Events in the year 1970 in Belgium.

Incumbents
Monarch: Baudouin
Prime Minister: Gaston Eyskens

Events
 16 August – Jacky Ickx wins 1970 Austrian Grand Prix at the Österreichring
 20 September – Jacky Ickx wins 1970 Canadian Grand Prix at Circuit Mont-Tremblant
 11 October – Municipal elections
 24 December – Constitutional amendment to reflect the legal status of communities, regions and language areas of Belgium.

Publications
 Luc André and Paul van Morckhoven, Contemporary Belgian Theatre (Brussels, Belgian Information and Documentation Institute)
 Jan Dhondt, The Industrial Revolution in Belgium and Holland, 1700–1914 (London, Collins)
 OECD, OECD Economic Surveys: B.L.E.U. 1970.

Art and architecture
Buildings
 Work beings on Jacques Cuisinier's Brusilia building (completed 1974)

Births
 17 January – Tom Hautekiet, graphic designer (died 2020)
 10 March – Benoît Lutgen, politician

Deaths

References

 
1970s in Belgium
Belgium
Years of the 20th century in Belgium
Belgium

janet